Diabolos is a 2005 album by Gackt.

Diabolos may also refer to:

Diabolos (διάβολος), a Greek word often translated as Devil
 "Diabolos", a song by Balzac from Terrifying! Art of Dying – The Last Men on Earth II, 2002
 "Diabolos", a song by Dir En Grey from Dum Spiro Spero, 2011
 "Diabolos", a song by Koffi Olomide

See also
 Diabolo (disambiguation)
 Diabolus in musica (disambiguation)
 Diablo (disambiguation)